is a song recorded by Canadian singer Celine Dion, taken from her tenth English-language studio album, Taking Chances (2007). It was written by Tino Izzo and Rosanna Ciciola, and produced by the Grammy-winning producer, John Shanks. Re-recorded as a duet with the Japanese singer Yuna Ito, it was released as the second single in Japan from Taking Chances on 16 January 2008, and also as the lead single from Dion's Japanese greatest hits album, Complete Best (2008). The duet version was also included on Ito's album, Wish (2008). The song reached number three on the Billboard Japan Hot 100 and number eight on the Oricon Singles Chart.

Background and release
The track was re-recorded in October 2007 as an English-Japanese duet with Yuna Ito, retitled as "あなたがいる限り: A World to Believe In." Dion was impressed when she heard Ito's cover of "My Heart Will Go On", featured on the Japan only released tribute album Tribute to Céline Dion from 26 September 2007, and proposed the idea of the duet together. The song was also featured on Ito's album, Wish.

"A World to Believe In" follows Ikimono-gakari's "Akaneiro no Yakusoku" to become the ninth LISMO cellphone service TV commercial song, aired from 1 December 2007.

The single debuted at number eight on the Japanese Oricon Singles Chart with 11,778 copies sold. In its second week it dropped to number twenty-two with 5,399 copies. After eight weeks the single has sold 24,105 copies in total. On the Oricon Daily Singles Chart the song peaked at number six. It also reached number three on the Billboard Japan Hot 100.

"あなたがいる限り: A World to Believe In" (U.S.A. mix) subsequently appeared as the first track on Dion's greatest hits album, called Complete Best, released on 27 February 2008.

Yuna Ito supported Dion's concerts in Japan, during her Taking Chances World Tour. Both artists performed their duet live on stage.

Music video
The videoclip was shot in Las Vegas, Nevada, in October 2007. It shows Dion and Ito in the recording studio. The video, released on 6 December 2007 was nominated at MTV Video Music Awards Japan in category Best Collaboration Video. It was commercially released on Ultimate Box, which includes two CDs and three DVDs.

Track listing and formats
Japanese CD single
"あなたがいる限り 〜A World to Believe In〜" – 4:10
"あなたがいる限り 〜A World to Believe In〜" (U.S.A. Mix) – 4:11
"あなたがいる限り 〜A World to Believe In〜" (Yuna Ito Solo Version) – 4:12		
"あなたがいる限り 〜A World to Believe In〜" (Instrumental) – 4:08

Charts

A World to Believe In: Himiko Fantasia
The melody of "A World to Believe In" was re-composed and the Japanese lyrics were added for the film Maboroshi no Yamataikoku, which stars Sayuri Yoshinaga. Celine Dion re-recorded it for the movie, which premiered on 1 November 2008. The single and the soundtrack were released in Japan on 22 October 2008.

The release of the CD single coincided with that of My Love: Essential Collection, a new compilation that was not released in Japan as Complete Best had already been issued that year. However, so that the Japanese were not excluded from the benefits of this new release, the two previously-unreleased tracks, "My Love (Live)" and "There Comes a Time," were included on the CD single, and the cover photo for the single was also taken from the new compilation.

No music video was made for "A World to Believe In: Himiko Fantasia."

The single debuted on 3 November 2008 at number 158 on the Japanese Oricon Singles Chart, selling 493 copies.

Track listing and formats
Japanese CD single
"A World to Believe In -Himiko Fantasia-" – 4:10
"A World to Believe In" (Album Version) – 4:09
"My Love" (Live Version) – 5:04
"There Comes a Time" – 4:03

Charts

Official versions
"A World to Believe In" (Album Version) – 4:09
"あなたがいる限り 〜A World to Believe In〜" – 4:10
"あなたがいる限り 〜A World to Believe In〜" (U.S.A. Mix) – 4:11
"あなたがいる限り 〜A World to Believe In〜" (Yuna Ito Solo Version) – 4:12		
"あなたがいる限り 〜A World to Believe In〜" (Instrumental) – 4:08
"A World to Believe In -Himiko Fantasia-" – 4:10

Release history

References

External links

Celine Dion songs
Yuna Ito songs
2008 singles
Female vocal duets
Pop ballads
2008 songs
Japanese film songs
Song recordings produced by John Shanks
Columbia Records singles
2000s ballads